The Fédération cynologique internationale (FCI) (English: International Canine Federation) is the largest international federation of national kennel clubs. It is based in Thuin, Belgium.

History
The FCI was founded in 1911 under the auspices of the kennel clubs of Austria, Belgium, France, Germany and the Netherlands. Its objective was to bring global uniformity to the breeding, exhibiting and judging of pure-bred dogs. It was disbanded in World War I and recreated in 1921 by Belgium and France. Since its foundation the FCI's membership has grown to include kennel clubs from across Europe as well as Africa, the Americas, Asia and Oceania.

The official purebred registries in North America that are not members or contract partners of FCI include the American Kennel Club (AKC), Canadian Kennel Club (CKC) and United Kennel Club (UKC), and in Europe, The Kennel Club (TKC). According to AKC's Denise Flaim, crafting a workable standard is a challenge, and the "FCI standards typically have a greater number of disqualifications, which are sometimes subjective, and their impact on a dog's career is not as dire."

Breeds
The FCI automatically recognises all registered breeds recognised by any of its member kennel clubs, therefore its list of recognised dog breeds includes breeds not known outside of their country of origin. The FCI divides the breeds it recognises into ten groups based on various discriminators such as appearance or role:
 Sheepdogs and cattle dogs (except Swiss cattle dogs)
 Pinschers and schnauzers - molossoid breeds - Swiss mountain and cattle dogs and other breeds
 Terriers
 Dachshunds
 Spitz and primitive types
 Scenthounds and related breeds
 Pointers and setters
 Retrievers - flushing dogs - water dogs
 Companion and toy dogs
 Sighthounds

FCI members

The FCI has members, associates and partners in 98 countries.

FCI partners

See also
 Dogs portal

References

External links

 
 FCI world championships calendar

 
Organizations established in 1911
Kennel clubs
Supraorganizations
Organisations based in Hainaut (province)
Thuin